Toni Kolehmainen (born 20 July 1988) is a Finnish former professional footballer who played as a midfielder.

He had previously played for AZ in Alkmaar, Netherlands. Kolehmainen also played in Blackburn Rovers' youth academy during 2004–05.

Early career

After ending his stay with Blackburn Rovers' youth academy Toni returned to Finland to play for OLS Oulu. In 2006, he joined town rival AC Oulu and helped the club gain promotion to the Veikkausliiga. His play with AC Oulu led to interest from Dutch Eredivisie club AZ Alkmaar who signed Kolehmainen in 2007.

Club career
During his time with AZ he was primarily a member of the reserve squad. In 2008, he was promoted to the first team squad by Louis van Gaal and made his debut in a 3-0 KNVB Cup victory over Achilles '29. Once the 2009 season concluded Kolehmainen did not exercise the option on his contract with AZ and returned to AC Oulu for a brief stay, which led to a promotion after the season.

Kolehmainen however left Oulu and went on signing a two-year contract with TPS in February 2010.

After some promising performances, Kolehmainen was spotted by Hønefoss BK, where he would reunite with a TPS teammate Riku Riski. A long-term contract was signed on 31 August 2012.

Kolehmainen retired in 2017, finishing his career at Polish side Wisła Puławy.

International career
On 22 January 2012 Kolehmainen scored for Finland in his senior level debut, in a friendly match against Trinidad and Tobago.

Career statistics

International goals

References

External links
Kolehmainen at AZ fan page 
Kolehmainen player card at AC Oulu 
A wonderkid from escadinavian soccer

1988 births
Living people
Sportspeople from Oulu
Finnish footballers
Finland international footballers
AC Oulu players
AZ Alkmaar players
Eredivisie players
Finnish expatriate footballers
Expatriate footballers in the Netherlands
Finnish expatriate sportspeople in the Netherlands
Expatriate footballers in Norway
Finnish expatriate sportspeople in Norway
Expatriate footballers in Poland
Turun Palloseura footballers
Veikkausliiga players
Hønefoss BK players
Norwegian First Division players
Eliteserien players
Helsingin Jalkapalloklubi players
Association football midfielders
Wisła Puławy players
Oulun Luistinseura players